Baltzer may refer to:

 Baltzer, Mississippi, U.S.
 Baltzer Science Publishers, Amsterdam-based defunct publisher of scientific journals

People 
 Baltzer Fleischer (1703–1767), Norwegian civil servant
 Anna Baltzer (born 1979), American public speaker, author and activist for Palestinian human rights
 Christian Baltzer (born 1936), French basketball player
 Eduard Baltzer (1814–1887), founder of the first German vegetarian society
 Johann Baptista Baltzer (1803–1871), German Roman Catholic theologian
 Wendy Baltzer, American veterinarian, small animal surgeon and academic

See also
 Baltser, a German colony that became Krasnoarmeysk, Saratov Oblast, Russia
 Thomas Baltzar (c. 1630–1663), German violinist and composer
 Balzer (disambiguation)